Daniel Viksten (born 10 September 1989) is a Swedish professional ice hockey forward. He is currently playing for Färjestad BK in the Swedish Hockey League (SHL). He signed a two-year contract as a free agent with Färjestad BK on 6 April 2018.

Awards and honours

References

External links
 

1989 births
Living people
Färjestad BK players
Malmö Redhawks players
Mora IK players
People from Mora Municipality
Örebro HK players
Swedish ice hockey right wingers
Sportspeople from Dalarna County